Between 2021 and 2022, there were a considerable number of books banned or challenged in the United States. Most of the targeted books have to do with race, gender, and sexuality. Unlike most book challenges in the past, whereby parents or other stakeholders in the community would engage teachers and school administrators in a debate over a title, local groups have received support from conservative advocacy organizations working to nationalize the efforts focused on certain subjects. They have also been more likely to involve legal and legislative measures rather than just conversations in local communities. Journalists, academics, librarians, and others commonly link the coordinated, often well-funded book challenges to other reactionary efforts to restrict what students should learn about systemic bias and the history of the United States. Hundreds of books have been challenged, including high-profile examples like Maus by Art Spiegelman and New Kid by Jerry Craft.

Background and scope 
In fall 2021, the American Library Association (ALA) received 330 reports of book challenges, a rate which it called "unprecedented", but also an undercount because the ALA estimates 82–97% of challenges are not reported. Only 1% of the challenges were initiated by students, and most were by parents or library patrons. The New York Times reported in January 2022 that "parents, activists, school board officials and lawmakers around the country are challenging books at a pace not seen in decades". In April 2022, nonprofit organization PEN America found that 1,586 book bans targeting 1,145 unique books had occurred in the past nine months. Also in April, the ALA published its annual report on book censorship, finding that there were 729 attempts to remove school, university and library materials in 2021, resulting in 1,597 book challenges or removals. This is the highest number of removals and challenges of books that the ALA has recorded in a single year since the organization began tracking book censorship more than 20 years ago. In the first eight months of 2022, the ALA received 681 reports of book challenges targeting 1,651 unique books. Most of the books have to do with race, sex, sexual orientation, and gender.

Parents, teachers, students, and other stakeholders commonly express concerns over the works students read in schools. Typically, the process of challenging a book's inclusion in curricula or in libraries involves the parties reading the book, debating its appropriateness, and making a decision at the level of a teacher, class, school, or district. The spate of challenges and bans in 2021–22 differ from the norm in number as well as the tactics and politics involved. Conservative organizations, activists, and politicians have driven many of the challenges, and they have operated through higher-level political processes than usual, proposing legislation and petitioning lawmakers rather than just teachers or local school boards.

The involvement of national advocacy groups also sets the 2021–22 trend apart from book challenges of the past. Organizations like No Left Turn in Education and Parents Defending Education operate nationally, with connections to wealthy conservative donors and organizations, but provide resources, connections, and sophisticated strategy to grow, support, and mobilize local parent groups. According to NBC News, as of June 2021, there were "at least 165 local and national groups that aim to disrupt lessons on race and gender". Several of the challenges have begun with lists of books shared online by conservative advocacy organizations like No Left Turn in Education and Moms for Liberty. The lists are distributed to parents who then audit local schools and libraries to see if they have any copies of the listed titles. No Left Turn in Education, for example, maintains lists of books in categories "critical race theory", "anti-police", and "comprehensive sexuality education", which they say "are used to spread radical and racist ideologies to students". The strategy of distributing lists has meant that many challenges come from people who have not actually read the books they argue to ban.

NBC News reported that while these groups operate differently, "they share strategies of disruption, publicity and mobilization. The groups swarm school board meetings, inundate districts with time-consuming public records requests and file lawsuits and federal complaints alleging discrimination against white students." One parent in Rhode Island submitted more than 200 records requests which took 300 staff hours to respond to. In some places, they teamed up with other activists fighting against public health restrictions in schools during the COVID-19 pandemic. The groups have also been successful in attracting attention in conservative media. According to University of Massachusetts political science professor Maurice T. Cunningham, the parents' rights groups are "highly networked into The Daily Caller, Breitbart [and] Fox News".

In 2020, the murder of George Floyd and other unarmed Black Americans by law enforcement led to widespread protests against police brutality and systemic racism. The public conversation about these concepts led some teachers and schools to talk about racism more with their students. That, and the Black Lives Matter movement in general, also fueled a reactionary movement advocating for teaching students an idealized version of the history of the United States which omits or whitewashes issues like racism. The book challenge trend is frequently linked by journalists and academics to other elements of that reactionary movement, especially the restrictions on teaching "critical race theory" which limit the extent to which students can learn about systemic racism and the history of race in the United States. Legislation was introduced or passed in at least 29 states taking aim at lessons that teach children about race and inequality, with most of the laws framed around putting a stop to "critical race theory". These laws, which use broad language prohibiting teaching about privilege related to race or sex, or systemic bias in the United States, have led to many book removals. NBC News described the use of the term "critical race theory" in this context as "a catch-all term to refer to what schools often call equity programs, teaching about racism or LGBTQ-inclusive policies". University of Michigan education professor Ebony Elizabeth Thomas summarized the issue as "an assumption that everything Black is critical race theory".

Proponents of removing books mention how certain kinds of lessons dealing with racism and history can make students uncomfortable and make white students feel guilty. In some other cases, the books have been by or about people of color or the LGBTQ community, but the reasons cited for removal have to do with profanity or sex. For example, The Hate U Give by Angie Thomas is about a black girl from a poor neighborhood who attends an elite, predominantly white private school and becomes entangled in a national news story after she witnesses a white police officer kill her childhood friend. It has been among the most challenged books primarily because it contains profanity.

According to Richard Price, a professor at Weber State University who studies book censorship, there is a "cycle of anxiety in which book challengers are driven by concerns and fears about a changing world. And so whatever the issue of the day is, then that usually drives and pushes people to try to remove books". Before the focus on critical race theory in 2020, the most commonly banned books had to do with LGBTQ inclusion. In her Washington Post analysis, Valerie Strauss contextualized the bans in the history of book censorship in the United States, dating back to charges of blasphemy in 1650 against William Pynchon's The Meritorious Price on Our Redemption, and spanning The Adventures of Huckleberry Finn, and the Harry Potter books, which were the most challenged books between 2000 and 2009. Strauss and education historian Adam Laats connected the trend to challenges of Darwin's On the Origin of Species and evolution in schools in the early 20th century which, according to Laats, involved similar strategies of mobilizing parents to take over school boards and widescale legislative proposals claiming to defend children's morality.

Reactions 
Free speech advocates, academics, journalists, and other critics have characterized the campaigns as part of a larger effort to use politics and legislation at the local and state level to impose on education an ideologically skewed version of the United States, its history, and its culture. The Takeaway's Melissa Harris-Perry cited discomfort with issues like gender identity as one of the common reasons for challenges, but that "this discomfort is likely imposed by adults onto young learners" who are otherwise more accepting and more likely to think outside traditional gender roles. Shauntee Burns-Simpson of the New York Public Library highlighted the issue of taking one page or one quote from a book without context and making a decision about the value of a book based on an initial reaction to that quote. Burns-Simpson also noted that banning the book does not just take away the words in the book, but the possibility for conversation about the concepts it raises.

The American Library Association released a statement signed by its Executive Board and Boards of Directors of its eight divisions in response to "a dramatic uptick in book challenges and outright removal of books from libraries". Their message condemned "a few organizations [which] have advanced the proposition that the voices of the marginalized have no place on library shelves... falsely claiming that these works are subversive, immoral, or worse [and inducing] officials to abandon constitutional principles, ignore the rule of law, and disregard individual rights to promote government censorship of library collections". A spokesperson told ABC News that in her time working with reports of book challenges, she had "never seen such a widespread effort to remove books on racial and gender diversity".

A spokesperson for the National Coalition Against Censorship said the events were "damaging to all stakeholders", including teachers who must comply, learners who do not read stories that reflect the world around them, and students from the marginalized groups depicted in the stories, who learn "that their own stories and their own lives aren't fit for consumption".

A number of authors whose works were banned spoke out. Some saw it as a badge of honor, while others found it distressing. Kalynn Bayron, author of Cinderella Is Dead, said "these things speak to the level of bigotry that still exists, specifically within our public education system". Kwame Alexander said some of the interest in banning books might have been avoided if advocates had more opportunities themselves as children to experience diverse perspectives. Mikki Kendall, whose book Hood Feminism was among the most challenged, said the bans are a "ridiculous publicity stunt" which would not actually stop kids from reading the books because "there's nothing more attractive to a kid than a forbidden book". Jason Reynolds, co-author of All American Boys, said the bans were more about parents "doing everything they can to shield young people from the things that scare them, not things that scare the children".

Several commentators argued it is hypocritical for conservative pundits and politicians to support banning books that may make students feel uncomfortable after a period of strongly criticizing "cancel culture".

In many cases, the banned books led to increased sales of those books, such as works by Jerry Craft, Toni Morrison, and Adam Rapp. The popularizing effects of banning any book, and the increased ease of access in the age of the Internet, mean the consequences of a ban are less significant than they were when books were harder to access, making it more of a ceremonial act. Some critics have argued this also makes some of the actions more about punishing educators and librarians or creating a chilling effect than limiting what students have access to. For example, proposed legislation in Iowa would allow for criminal prosecution of librarians. University of Chicago history professor Ada Palmer said that the main goal of censorship throughout history has not been "to silence or destroy books or works that already exist [but] to frighten people and discourage them from reading, buying and creating similar works in the future".

Adam Szetela of Newsweek opined that both the right and the left are "guilty" of banning books, citing the ban of To Kill a Mockingbird in California schools, Dr. Seuss' books being pulled from libraries and bookstores, and videos of liberals burning Harry Potter books. Angela Haupt of The Washington Post also noted efforts by Democratic politicians and liberal parents to ban books for containing racist language, racial slurs and "white savior" characters, including Adventures of Huckleberry Finn, To Kill a Mockingbird and Of Mice and Men. Katherine Mangu-Ward of Reason noted that the ALA's list of challenged and banned books "suggests book banners lean right—with an increasing emphasis on books with queer themes or characters, for example—though book challenges come from across the spectrum of political opinion and aesthetic preference.", but added that "It's debatable whether the list's bias is an artifact of the collectors' concerns or simply a reflection of an underlying reality." Kyle Smith of National Review accused the media of a double standard when labeling the removal of Maus from the McMinn County, Tennessee school curriculum by the school board as a "ban", while not using the same label for when To Kill a Mockingbird was removed from required curriculum by a school board in Washington State.

Notable cases

Central York School District 
In August 2020, a diversity committee in the school district for central York County, Pennsylvania, created a reading list for students and community members amid the George Floyd protests. Though it was intended as a guide for students to learn about issues of race, diversity, and culture, the school board used it as a list of books to remove, voting to "freeze" them a few months later. Though the board decision did not attract much attention, an email from the school principal to staff in August 2021 received significant pushback. In the email, the principal told teachers they were prohibited from using any of the materials on the list in their classes. The hundreds of works on the list were largely about representation of Black and Latin American in the United States. As described by The New York Times, some parents objected to material that would "make white children feel guilty about their race or 'indoctrinate' students". Students protested, wearing black t-shirts, advocating on social media, and picketing daily before school started. Officials argued that the books were "frozen" rather than "banned" until they could be evaluated, although the books remained off of the shelves for nearly a year. A spokesperson for the Pennsylvania State Education Association told the York Daily Record that "if you look at this material, it's offensive what they banned. They have banned materials from Black voices, and they've had almost a year now and they haven't proposed anything else". The school board met again to discuss the ban in September 2021, and decided to reaffirm it. Amid criticism, it reconvened shortly thereafter and reversed its decision, saying it never intended to ban the material, but rather wanted time to review it.

Texas House Bill 3979 
Texas passed House Bill 3979 in July 2021. Known as Texas's "critical race theory law", after an academic field which became a common objection for conservatives, it restricts the manner and extent to which students may learn about or discuss race, racism, sex, or sexism, or the role of those concepts in American culture and history. The law, and confusion over how to enforce it, led to many book challenges.

In October 2021, Texas Representative Matt Krause distributed a list to Texas school superintendents containing 850 books having to do with race, sexuality, and history which might "make students feel discomfort". Most of the books' authors are women, people of color, or LGBTQ. Krause wanted to know which school districts had the books and how much was spent on them. The list included a wide range of fiction and non-fiction bestsellers and award-winners like The Confessions of Nat Turner by William Styron, Between the World and Me by Ta-Nehisi Coates, LGBT Families by Leanne K. Currie-McGhee, Hood Feminism: Notes from the Women that a Movement Forgot by Mikki Kendall, The Underground Guide to Teenage Sexuality: An Essential Handbook for Today's Teens and Parents by Michael J. Basso, and Amnesty International's We Are All Born Free: The Universal Declaration of Human Rights in Pictures. Authors on the list reacted with a mix of outrage and pride. The president of the Texas State Teachers Association called it a "witch hunt" and a "disturbing and political overreach into the classroom" which raises legal concerns. While Krause did not make his motivations or intentions clear, the Texas Tribune speculated it may have to do with House Bill 3979.

The Katy Independent School District removed New Kid by Jerry Craft in October 2021 and canceled an event with the author. The graphic novel, which won the 2020 Kirkus Prize, Newbury Medal, and Coretta Scot King Award, is about a 12-year-old black boy who experiences culture shock when he enrolls at a private school. The district reacted to a petition which said the book promoted critical race theory, Marxism, and "reverse racism". The person who began the petition, who also sued the school district over a mask mandate, said she heard Craft talking about "microaggressions" in interviews, which she said indicated an ideology related to critical race theory. According to Craft, he was not even aware of critical race theory when he wrote it. After receiving national attention, a review committee decided to reinstate the book and reschedule Craft's event.

In November 2021, Governor Greg Abbott publicized his investigation into pornography and obscenity accessible to kids in school libraries.

Following the investigations by Krause and Abbott, a San Antonio district removed more than 400 books in December 2021.

McMinn County Schools 
Maus is a nonfiction book by Art Spiegelman in which he interviews his father about his experiences as a Polish Jew and Holocaust survivor. The work is presented as a graphic novel, and it depicts groups of people as different kinds of animals. It was the first graphic novel to win a Pulitzer Prize.

On January 10, 2022, the board of trustees of McMinn County Schools in Tennessee removed Maus from its schools' curriculum, expressing concern over its use in 8th grade English Language Arts classes. The decision overruled a state curriculum review that had approved the book. The board cited "tough language" and "unnecessary" profanity (eight words, including "damn"), a small drawing of a (nude) cat representing a woman, and mentions of murder, violence, and suicide. The board questioned its age-appropriateness and whether it aligned with the values of the community.

The removal attracted criticism and international media attention the day before Holocaust Remembrance Day. Spiegelman called the decision "Orwellian" and said reading the minutes of the board meeting indicated the board was effectively asking "Why can't they teach a nicer Holocaust?". Several elected officials, writers, journalists, librarians, and academics spoke out against it. James Blasingame of Arizona State University argued that what makes Maus disturbing is what should make any book about the Holocaust disturbing.

Following publicity around the ban, sales of Maus spiked, becoming the number one best-seller on Amazon. A bookstore in Tennessee offered to give a free copy of The Complete Maus to any student who requested one, leading them to create a GoFundMe campaign to cover the demand.

Madison County Public Library System 
A mayor in Ridgeland, Mississippi denied $110,000 in funding to the Madison County Public Library System that had already been approved by the city's board of aldermen. His justification for doing so was the library's possession of books on LGBTQ+ topics. The mayor stated that he would not release the funds until all of those books were removed, citing his personal religious beliefs. Tonja Jackson, the executive director of the library stated, "I explained that we are a public library and we serve the entire community. I told him our collection reflects the diversity of our community. He told me that the library can serve whoever we wanted, but that he only serves the great Lord above."The library began a fundraiser due to the funding being withheld, and raised $77,000 in an eight day period. The board of aldermen met as a result of the funding being withheld, with more than twenty members of the public speaking, and the meeting lasted for two hours. One member of the public described the books as "filth" and "pornographic."

Hamilton County School Board 
The Hamilton County, Tennessee School board created a book-review committee with the intent to draft a policy regarding book selections in public school libraries and complaints of books already on shelves.  This committee contained two representatives from each of the nine current Hamilton County school districts in which each member was invited to share their thoughts and views on the policy and how it should be changed.

The committee was formed after School Board Chairman Tucker McClendon introduced the idea and it was agreed to be led by district 1 representative Rhonda Thurman. Thurman explained that her reasoning behind chairing the committee is because, "I’m just wanting to inform the public about what their tax dollars are paying for, what’s in the libraries, the process". In a personal opinion piece, Thurman cited four books and discussed why they are unfit to be in school libraries: "More Than We Can Tell" by Brigid Kemmerer, "On the Come Up" by Angie Thomas, "Far from the Tree" by Robin Benway and "The Hate U Give" by Angie Thomas.

After several weeks of debate, the new policies, 4.402 and 4.403, were then presented to the Hamilton County School Board's March 17, 2022 meeting. The policy requires reported books to be evaluated on a balancing test of its offensiveness to its literary value. Those books whose offensive material outweighs its literary value will be removed from school library shelves.

With this topic being debated in Hamilton County since 2021, many community members representing both sides of this debate have spoken out about the proposed policy changes. Many organizations, like the Tennessee Association of School Librarians, Tennessee Library Association, and Friends of the Tennessee Libraries have spoken out against the school board and Thurman, citing that, "students' 'freedom to read and unfettered access to information is protected by their First Amendment rights". At the March 17, 2022 school board meeting, when the policy was presented, approximately ten community members addressed the school board during public comment both in support of and against the newly proposed policy.

Policies 4.402 and 4.403 are currently being revised and updated by school board attorney Scott Bennett. Once finalized, the policies will then be submitted and must go through debate amongst the school board and two separate votes for the policy to be enacted.

See also 

 Banned Books Week
 Book censorship in the United States
 Censorship of school curricula in the United States
 Democratic backsliding in the United States

References

2021 in the United States
2022 in the United States
Book censorship in the United States